Logan Bruss (born October 6, 1999) is an American football offensive guard for the Los Angeles Rams of the National Football League (NFL). He played college football at Wisconsin.

Professional career

Bruss was drafted by the Los Angeles Rams in the third round, 104th overall, of the 2022 NFL Draft. He suffered a torn ACL and MCL in the team's second preseason game and was ruled out for his rookie season.

References

External links
 Los Angeles Rams bio
 Wisconsin Badgers bio

Los Angeles Rams players
American football offensive guards
Wisconsin Badgers football players
American football offensive tackles
1999 births
Living people